People's Party – Reformists ( or NS-R) is a liberal political party in Croatia.

History
The civil initiative for the establishment of the party was launched by former Croatian People's Party – Liberal Democrats (HNS) chief Radimir Čačić and his associates Natalija Martinčević and Petar Baranović. More than two-thirds of the party members are former members of the HNS which left the party because of disagreements with its leadership over the exclusion of Radimir Čačić from the party while he was serving a prison sentence for unintentionally causing a traffic accident with two fatalities.

According to the parties former acting president Natalija Martinčević, about 200 members from HNS Zagreb and Varaždin branches each have left the party in order to join the People's party - Reformists.

The party's founding congress was held on September 28, 2014 in Zagreb. Radimir Čačić was unanimously elected for the first party president.

Election history
Ahead of the 2015 parliamentary election the party formed a coalition, "Successful Croatia", with the centre-left Forward Croatia-Progressive Alliance. In the 2015 election, the party won one seat in the Croatian Parliament in the III electoral district, held by Radimir Čačić. Čačić voted in favor of approving Cabinet of Tihomir Orešković. Party participated at the 2016 extraordinary parliamentary election as part of the For Prime Minister Coalition led by Mayor of Zagreb Milan Bandić, and eventually won 1 seat. NS-R voted in favor of approving Cabinet of Andrej Plenković. At the 2017 local elections, Radimir Čačić was elected prefect of Varaždin County and Darinko Dumbović mayor of Petrinja. NS-R also entered many county, city, and municipal councils, mostly in Northern Croatia.

Presidential 
The following is a list of presidential candidates who were endorsed by NS-R.

Legislative
The following is a summary of the party's results in legislative elections for the Croatian parliament. The "total votes" and "percentage" columns include sums of votes won by pre-election coalitions NS-R had been part of.

European Parliament

References

2014 establishments in Croatia
Political parties established in 2014
Liberal parties in Croatia
Centrist parties in Croatia
European Democratic Party
Organizations based in Zagreb
Pro-European political parties in Croatia